The Central European Press and Media Foundation or CEPMF (KESMA) is a Hungarian foundation controlling many of the country's media outlets. Its assets consist of cable news channels, radio stations, internet news portals, newspapers and magazines, including Hír TV, Origo, Mandiner, Nemzeti Sport, Magyar Nemzet, Világgazdaság, Bors and Figyelő. The joint estimated value of the foundations assets is over 88 million euros. 

The foundation has been criticized by the European Federation of Journalists and the European Centre for Press and Media Freedom for its close ties to Hungarian prime minister Viktor Orbán. The news outlets owned by the foundation were acquired or founded by allies of Orbán in the past few years and then donated to the foundation in 2018. The foundation’s media operations between 2018 and 2020 were led by Gábor Liszkay, a newspaper publisher known for his loyalty to Orban.

Notes and references

2018 establishments in Hungary
Mass media in Hungary